Tell Amarna is an archaeological site in northern Syria, on the west bank of the Euphrates.

Archaeological research 
The site was investigated as part of the archaeological salvage excavations conducted due to the building of the Tishrin Dam on the Euphrates. From 1991 to 1998, a mission from the University of Liège, directed by Önhan Tunca, worked there at the invitation of the Syrian Direction Générale des Antiquités et Museums. Eight excavation seasons carried out on the 20-m-high tell revealed layers dating from the Halaf culture (6th millennium BC) through the Byzantine period (5th century AD). After the discovery of a basilica, dated to the 5th century AD, archaeologists and conservators from the Polish Centre of Mediterranean Archaeology University of Warsaw were asked to assist in the restoration and interpretation of this building. The Polish team was headed by Dr. Tomasz Waliszewski (Institute of Archaeology of the University of Warsaw) and Dr. Krzysztof Chmielewski (Academy of Fine Arts in Warsaw). In 2000 and 2001, archaeologists and conservators from Belgium, Poland, and Syria worked at the site. More than 40 mosaic fragments were transported to a storeroom in Damascus where they underwent conservation in 2004–2005. Thirteen of them formed the core of the exhibition “Tell Amarna in Syria; From the 6th Millennium BC Painted Pottery to the Byzantine Mosaics”, which was presented in 2005 first in Belgium and then in Poland, in the State Archaeological Museum in Warsaw.

Further reading 

 Tunca, Ö.; Waliszewski, T. & Koniordos, V. (Eds.) (2011). Tell Amarna (Syrie) V. La basilique byzantine et ses mosaïques, PEETERS, Louvain–Paris–Dudley (MA); (=Publications de la Mission archéologique de l’Université de Liège en Syrie, vol. 5).
 Tunca, Ö., Molist, M.(Eds.) (2014). Tell Amarna (Syrie) – La période de Halaf.

Footnotes

External links 

 Tell Amarna in Syria – about the rescue excavations at the site

See also 
Euphrates Syrian Pillar Figurines
Euphrates Handmade Syrian Horses and Riders

Archaeological sites in Syria
Christian art
Tells (archaeology)